Pentasalia may be
 misspelling of Pentacalia, genus of Asteraceae plants in the Americas
 misspelling of Pentasilia, Amazon queen in Greek myth